Thomas L. Kaczynski Jr. (born  1955) is a New Hampshire politician.

Early life
Kaczynski was born around 1955. Kaczynski is a graduate of East Haven High School.

Career
Kaczynski is a live poultry dealer. On November 4, 2014, Kaczynski was elected to the New Hampshire House of Representatives where he represented the Strafford 22 district from December 3, 2014 to December 5, 2018. On November 6, 2018, Kaczynski sought re-election, but was defeated by Democrat Peg Higgins. On November 3, 2020, Kaczynski was again elected to the New Hampshire House of Representatives seat which represents the Strafford 22 district, defeating Higgins in her attempt at re-election. He assumed office again on December 2, 2020. He is a Republican.

Personal life
Kaczynski resides in Rochester, New Hampshire. Kaczynski is married and has a child.

References

Living people
1950s births
Republican Party members of the New Hampshire House of Representatives
People from Rochester, New Hampshire
21st-century American politicians